= Khurchani =

- village
- Location within Madhya Pradesh Location within India
- Coordinates: 23.142364°N 77.258602°E
- Country: India
- State: Madhya Pradesh
- District: Bhopal
- Tehsil: Huzur

Population (2011)
  - Total: 978
- Time zone: UTC+5:30 (IST)
- ISO 3166 code: MP-IN
- Census code: 482500

Khurchani is a village in the Bhopal district of Madhya Pradesh, India. It is located in the Huzur tehsil and the Phanda block.

== Demographics ==
According to the 2011 census of India, Khurchani has 190 households. The effective literacy rate (i.e. the literacy rate of population excluding children aged 6 and below) is 59.98%.

Demographics (2011 Census)
	Total	Male	Female
Population	978	521	457
Children aged below 6 years	121	69	52
Scheduled caste	208	116	92
Scheduled tribe	5	4	1
Literates	514	325	189
Workers (all)	464	257	207
Main workers (total)	335	184	151
Main workers: Cultivators	268	144	124
Main workers: Agricultural labourers	49	27	22
Main workers: Household industry workers	0	0	0
Main workers: Other	18	13	5
Marginal workers (total)	129	73	56
Marginal workers: Cultivators	10	2	8
Marginal workers: Agricultural labourers	117	69	48
Marginal workers: Household industry workers	0	0	0
Marginal workers: Others	2	2	0
Non-workers	514	264	250
